Oruç Bey (Oruç bin Âdil) was a 15th-century Ottoman historian.

Life and career
Almost nothing is known from his personal life. Based on the information in the intro of his chronicle, it is believed that he was a clerk born in Edirne and that his father was a silk manufacturer.

Works
Oruç Bey's work is called Oruç Bey Tarihi ("The History of Oruç Bey"), sometimes named similarly to other Ottoman chronicles "" (History of the house of Osman). It is written in Ottoman Turkish and describes the Ottoman history till Hijrah 907 (anno1501/1502). His chronicle is considered as an important source for the history of the early Ottoman Empire.

See also
List of Muslim historians

References

Bibliography
  Franz Babinger, Berlin, "Die frühosmanischen Jahrbücher des Urudsch"

15th-century historians from the Ottoman Empire